The 1998-99 Four Hills Tournament took place at the four traditional venues of Oberstdorf, Garmisch-Partenkirchen, Innsbruck and Bischofshofen, located in Germany and Austria, between 30 December 1998 and 6 January 1999.

Results

Overall

References

External links 
  

1998-99
1998 in ski jumping
1999 in ski jumping
1998 in German sport
1999 in German sport
1999 in Austrian sport